İbrahim Kaypakkaya (1949 – May 18, 1973) was a Turkish communist revolutionary, who was a leader of the communist movement in Turkey and the founder of the Communist Party of Turkey/Marxist-Leninist (TKP/ML). He is revered by many today as a symbol of resistance and as an aggregator of the ideas of other major leaders and thinkers in Marxism–Leninism–Maoism. Kaypakkaya was captured after being wounded in an engagement with the Turkish military in Tunceli Province in 1973, and executed in Diyarbakir Prison four months later.

Life
Ibrahim Kaypakkaya was born in 1949 to a Turkish Alevi family. In his youth he delivered political magazines in the neighboring villages. Later he was exposed to revolutionary ideas as a student in the Physics Department of Istanbul University’s Faculty of Science. He became a member of the Revolutionary Workers and Peasants Party of Turkey. In 1967 he was one of the founders of a local branch of the Federation of Idea Clubs. He joined the foundation of the Çapa Idea Club in March 1968 and became the President of the club. In November 1968, Kaypakkaya was expelled from the University for preparing a leaflet against the visiting 6th Fleet of the U.S. Navy.

Kaypakkaya, who adopted the view of National Democratic Revolution, worked for the newspaper İşçi Köylü ("Worker-Peasant"). He wrote articles in the magazines Aydınlık ("Enlightenment") and TÜRKSOLU ("Turkish Left"; not to be confused with the modern magazine Türksolu). Kaypakkaya then split from Doğu Perinçek and his group, as he considered Perinçek to be a revisionist and an opportunist. Kaypakkaya, who participated in the struggle of peasantry, formed TİKKO ("Workers' and Peasants' Liberation Army"), the armed wing of his Communist Party of Turkey/Marxist-Leninist, and carried out activities in the cities of Tunceli, Malatya, and Gaziantep.

Kaypakkaya and his comrades interrogated and shot the informer village headman who caused the killing of THKO ("People's Liberation Army of Turkey") members Sinan Cemgil and his two other comrades by the state forces during a gunfight. Kaypakkaya became a symbol of revolutionary solidarity and camaraderie to his supporters during the period of martial law.

Capture and death
Following the military memorandum of 1971, the Turkish government cracked down on the Communist movement in Turkey. On 24 January 1973, Kaypakkaya and his allies were attacked by Turkish military forces in the mountains of Tunceli. He was wounded badly, and his comrade Ali Haydar Yıldız died. The military left Kaypakkaya for dead, allowing him to avoid capture. During that winter, severe weather conditions and snow forced him to take shelter in a cave for five days. Thereafter, he left for a village where he asked for assistance from a local teacher. Initially, the man allowed Kaypakkaya to take shelter in a room but then locked the door and reported him to the military.

The Turkish Government persecuted and destroyed the leadership of the TKP/ML. Kaypakkaya, and several of his colleagues were arrested. Kaypakkaya was executed by shooting in prison in 1973. On 18 May 1973, he was tortured to the brink of death and then shot and killed by military officers at the age of twenty-four. His corpse was mutilated and cut up.

The National Intelligence Organization (MİT) reported that Kaypakkaya was the most dangerous revolutionary in Turkey and a serious threat to the non-communist government.

Cultural legacy
After his death, Kaypakkaya became a martyr for the Turkish Communist revolutionary movement by "choosing to die rather than give information." Despite his young age, he was one of the most prominent Marxist theorists of Turkey. Kaypakkaya's most well known work is his critique of Kemalism, the state principles of Turkey, and his thesis on the national question, notably the Kurdish question.

Doctrine
His doctrinal views were based on splitting away from the neighboring Soviet Union's ideology and taking up Maoism and supporting the Cultural Revolution. As such, Kaypakkaya's life was heavily shaped by the Sino-Soviet split.

Kaypakkaya also took the position that there is a national question involved with the Kurdish people.

TKP/ML
Communist Party of Turkey/Marxist-Leninist re-organized between 1973 and 1978. The first party congress took place in 1978 (TKP/ML I. Kongresi in Turkish). In 1981 the second congress was organized (TKP/ML II. Kongresi).  The party split following the second congress, the splinter taking up the name Bolshevik Party (North Kurdistan-Turkey).

However it was neither the first nor the last split in the party. The Communist Party of Turkey/Marxist-Leninist - Hareketi had already split in (1976) during the re-organisation period. Other splits followed the second congress: Communist Party of Turkey/Marxist-Leninist - Revolutionary Proletarian (1987), Communist Party of Turkey/Marxist-Leninist (Maoist Party Centre) (1987), and Maoist Communist Party (1994).

Today the organisation is listed among the 12 active terrorist organisation in Turkey as of 2007 according to Counter-Terrorism and Operations Department of Directorate General for Security (Turkish police).

In culture

Music 
 Grup Munzur - İsyan Ateşi
 Emekçi - İbrahime Ağıt
 Ozan Emekçi - Diyarbakır Zindanları
 İlkay Akkaya -  Ibrahim yoldaş

Films 
 Kırmızı Gül Buz İçinde
 Sönmeyen Ateş - İbrahim Kaypakkaya

References

External links
Ibrahim Kaypakkaya Archive at marxists.org
Ibrahim Kaypakkaya Selected Works
"Long live Ibrahim Kaypakkaya's thought!", by the CPMLMF
"His Name is Our Pride, His Party is Our Honor, His Doctrine is Our Guide”, by the TKP/ML

1949 births
1973 deaths
20th-century executions by Turkey
Anti-revisionists
Communist Party of Turkey/Marxist–Leninist politicians
Deaths by firearm in Turkey
Executed communists
Executed revolutionaries
Maoist theorists
Revolutionary Workers' and Peasants' Party of Turkey politicians
Turkish atheists
Turkish communists
Turkish Marxists
Turkish people who died in prison custody
Turkish revolutionaries
Turkish torture victims